Konstantinos Zervas (born 1964) is the 61st and current mayor of Thessaloniki, the second-largest city in Greece.

Biography

Early life
Konstantinos Zervas is born in Thessaloniki in 1964. He is the son of Vasilis Zervas—a civil engineer—and Lilika Zerva-Ologa—a philologist. He has two older sisters. 

Zervas attended the German School of Thessaloniki and the Experimental School of Thessaloniki. He graduated from the Department of Civil Engineering of the Aristotle University of Thessaloniki and received a Masters of Science from Brown University in 1989.

Political career
From 1994 to 1997 he was a member of the board of directors of PAOK. He was a member of the board of directors of Attiko Metro SA between 2010 and 2016. He graduated with a degree in Civil Engineering at the Aristotle University in Thessaloniki.

In 2011 Zervas became the City Coucilor and Deputy mayor for the environment, quality of life and Free Space. In the calendar year of 2014 he got re-elected but instead got the position as a Citizen's Mobility, Youth and Sport deputy. Zervas exited his position in 2015 due to disagreements in major policies.

In 2019 Zervas was elected mayor of Thessaloniki. He received 66.82% of the votes, while his opponent Nikos Tahiaos received 33.18% of the votes. In 2019 he authored a book called "Thoughts for Thessaloniki and politics". Between 2011 and 2014 he was employed as the Chairman of the State Orchestra Board of Thessaloniki (SOB) and in 2013 he was elected as a member of the Central Representation of the Technical Chamber of Greece and the regional department of Central Macedonia.

References

Living people
Greek politicians
1964 births
Mayors of Thessaloniki
Aristotle University of Thessaloniki alumni
Brown University alumni
Politicians from Thessaloniki